During the 2002–03 English football season, Swansea City competed in the Football League Third Division.

Season summary
Swansea narrowly avoided relegation from the Football League, just over 20 years after coming sixth in the top flight, with a final 21st-place finish. Swansea were in danger of relegation, but won their final game of the season to assure their status as a Football League club.

Swansea fared little better in the domestic cups, being knocked out in the first round of both the FA Cup (by Third Division York City) and League Cup (by First Division Wolverhampton Wanderers).

Squad
Squad at end of season

Left club during season

References

Swansea City A.F.C. seasons
Swansea City
Swansea City